Mate Pavić and Michael Venus were the defending champions, but lost to Juan Sebastián Cabal and Robert Farah in the final, 6–4, 4–6, [8–10].

Seeds

Draw

Draw

External links
 Main draw

Doubles